Snells Nook Halt railway station was a station on the Charnwood Forest Railway. Near the village of Nanpantan, on the outskirts of Loughborough, Leicestershire.

It opened on 2 April 1907 as a stop on the line between Loughborough Derby Road and Coalville East.

The halt closed on 13 April 1931 when passenger services on the line were withdrawn. Today, nothing remains of the halt but the line is still traceable.

References

Route 

Disused railway stations in Leicestershire
Former London and North Western Railway stations
Railway stations in Great Britain opened in 1907
Railway stations in Great Britain closed in 1931